Villers-Cotterêts is a commune in the Aisne department in Hauts-de-France, France. It is notable as the signing-place in 1539 of the Ordinance of Villers-Cotterêts discontinuing the use of Latin in official French documents, and as the birthplace in 1802 of French novelist Alexandre Dumas  père.

Geography
It is located  NE of Paris via the RN2 facing Laon.

History
Villers-Cotterêts is famous in French law because of the Ordinance of Villers-Cotterêts of 1539 signed by king Francis I of France ('François Ier'), which made French the official language in the kingdom instead of regional languages like Occitan or the elite European lingua franca of the time, Latin.

In 1914, the British Expeditionary Force fought a rearguard action here during the Retreat from Mons. On 1 September, the British 4th (Guards) Brigade who were covering the withdrawal of 2nd Division, came into contact with the leading units of the German III Corps on the edge of woodland near Villers-Cotterêts. The brigade lost more than 300 men in the encounter, but were able to break away and continue the withdrawal. Many are buried at Guards' Grave, a military cemetery maintained by the Commonwealth War Graves Commission. An ancillary hospital to that of Royaumont was set up in the town and a silent documentary about it was made.

La Plaine Saint-Rémy, Pisseleux, was an ancient commune that was merged with Villers-Cotterêts in 1971.

Population

The inhabitants are called Cottevreziens in French.

Notable residents
 Charles Baur (1929–2015), Mayor of Villers-Cotterêts (1953–1989), President of the Regional Council of Picardy (1976–1978, 1985–2004)

Sports
The town was the start of Stage 4 in the 2007 Tour de France.

Sights
The original château was built around 950 AD and was burnt to the ground twice before being rebuilt out of stone in the early 12th century.  The front entrance is the only original remaining structure, which is listed with the Historic Monument Registry at the École des Beaux Arts. Francis I purchased the château from the de Noüe family to house his mistress Anne de Pisseleu d'Heilly. The  was updated with 18th-century régence decoration by Gilles-Marie Oppenordt.  The current owner is the Pépinières du Valois, an agricultural venture.

In 1902 the city opened a Museum Alexandre Dumas to gather souvenirs about the family. In 1952 the museum moved to a local 19th century mansion that served as General Maunoury's headquarters during the First World War. It has three rooms, each of them dedicated to one of the family members, being Thomas-Alexandre Dumas, his son novelist Alexandre Dumas père and grandson novelist/playwright Alexandre Dumas fils.

See also

 Communes of the Aisne department

Gallery

References

External links

 Tourist office website (in French)
 Historic society of Villers-Cotterêts (in French)
 The Catholic Encyclopedia entry on Gilles-Marie Oppenordt

Communes of Aisne
Aisne communes articles needing translation from French Wikipedia